+Bien (or Más Bien) is the eponymous soundtrack for the Argentine-produced film released in 2001. All 11 tracks were composed and performed by Gustavo Cerati for the movie. Cerati also acted in the movie.

Track listing

References

Gustavo Cerati soundtracks
2001 soundtrack albums
Film soundtracks
Sony International soundtracks
Instrumental soundtracks